The Central Mountain Range is the principal mountain range on the island of Taiwan. It runs from the north of the island to the south. Due to this separation, connecting between the west and east is not very convenient. The tallest peak of the range is Xiuguluan Mountain, .

Names
"Central Range" or "Central Mountain Range" is a calque of the range's Chinese name, the Zhōngyāng Shānmài or Shānmò.

Geography
In a broad sense, Central Mountain Range includes its conjoint ranges such as Xueshan Range and Yushan Range; thus the tallest peak of Central Mountain Range in this sense is Yushan (Jade Mountain/Mount Morrison), and the second tallest peak is Xueshan (Snow Mountain), .

Ecology
The Central Range lies within the Taiwan subtropical evergreen forests ecoregion, and the composition of the forest varies with elevation. The coastal plains and lower elevations are covered by evergreen laurel-Castanopsis forests dominated by Cryptocarya chinensis and Castanopsis hystrix with scattered stands of the subtropical pine Pinus massoniana. As elevation increases, the evergreen broadleaf trees are gradually replaced by deciduous broadleaf trees and conifers. At higher elevations,  Cyclobalanopsis glauca replaces laurel and Castanopsis as the dominant tree.

Above , deciduous broadleaf trees like Formosan alder (Alnus formosana) and maple (Acer spp.) mix with Taiwan hemlock (Tsuga chinensis).  At the highest elevations, subalpine forests are dominated by conifers, including Taiwan hemlock, Taiwan spruce (Picea morrisonicola), and Taiwan fir (Abies kawakamii).

See also
 Geography of Taiwan

References

Citations

Bibliography
 .

External links

 

Mountain ranges of Taiwan
Landforms of Hualien County